The Netherlands national cricket team (Dutch: Nederlandse cricket team) is the men's team that represents the Kingdom of the Netherlands and is administered by the Royal Dutch Cricket Association.

Cricket has been played in the Netherlands since at least the 19th century, and in the 1860s was considered a major sport in the country. Other sports – notably football – have long since surpassed cricket in popularity amongst the Dutch, but today there are around 6,000 cricketers in the Netherlands. The first national association, the forerunner of today's Royal Dutch Cricket Association, was formed in 1890 and the Netherlands achieved Associate Membership of the International Cricket Council (ICC) in 1966.

The Netherlands have taken part in all eleven ICC Trophy/World Cup Qualifier tournaments, winning the competition in Canada in 2001 and finishing as runners-up twice (in 1986 and 1990). The Netherlands also participated in the 1996, 2003, 2007 and 2011 Cricket World Cups, and from 1995 onwards the national team entered the English domestic NatWest Trophy competition (and its successor, the C&G Trophy). In 2004 they played first-class cricket in the ICC Intercontinental Cup, drawing with Scotland in Aberdeen and then going down to an innings defeat against Ireland in Deventer.

The Netherlands enjoyed full One Day International status from 1 January 2006 until 1 February 2014. They regained Twenty20 International status in June 2014, having played their first match in this format in 2008. The Netherlands regained their ODI status after the conclusion of the 2018 Cricket World Cup Qualifier in March 2018. They had guaranteed this status before the tournament as a result of winning the 2015–17 ICC World Cricket League Championship and thus qualifying for the 2020–23 ICC Cricket World Cup Super League, and will retain the status until the 2023 Cricket World Cup Qualifier.

In April 2018, the ICC decided to grant full Twenty20 International (T20I) status to all its members. Therefore, all Twenty20 matches played between the Netherlands and other ICC members after 1 January 2019 will be a full T20I. Scott Edwards is the current team captain.

History

19th century

Cricket was introduced to the Netherlands by British soldiers during the Napoleonic Wars in the 19th century. Further clubs came into existence in the 1870s. The Netherlands national team played their first game in 1881. They fielded 22 players against an Uxbridge Cricket Club XI, but still lost by an innings. The Dutch Cricket Union was formed in 1890, with 18 member clubs, four of which are still in existence today.

The first national tournament was held the following year, and was won by Haagsche CC. English touring teams then began visiting in 1890 including one in 1891 that featured the author of Sherlock Holmes, Sir Arthur Conan Doyle.

In 1894, the Gentlemen of Holland were the first Dutch team to visit England. The tour included a game against the MCC at Lord's, which the MCC won by an innings and 169 runs. Tours by English sides continued for the rest of the 1890s, which also saw the emergence of Carst Posthuma, who was later the first Dutch player to play first class cricket. He took 2339 wickets at an average of 8.66 in his career in the Netherlands.

1900s to 1910s

1901 saw another visit to England by the Gentlemen of Holland. They played five games on the tour, drawing two and losing the remainder. 1905 saw the first international game against Belgium, which finished in a draw. Cricket began a decline in popularity in the first decade of the 20th century, particularly amongst young athletes, due, in part, to the Dutch sympathizing with the Boers in the Boer War and therefore not being attracted to a game with links to England.

In 1910, the Dutch team visited Belgium to take part in an exhibition tournament, which also featured the MCC, Belgium and France. They lost to the MCC by 2 wickets, and to France by 63 runs, but beat Belgium by 116 runs.

During World War I, in which the Netherlands remained neutral, large numbers of British officers were interned in the country, and many of these joined local cricket clubs. A team made up of these players even won the Dutch championship in 1918.

1920s to 1940s

The Flamingos, a Dutch touring side, was formed in 1921, and later made several tours of England. Tours by English teams also continued in this period. The 1930s are said to be the heyday of Dutch cricket. In 1934, the first Dutch women's league was formed, and the women's national team played two games against Australia in 1937, losing heavily in both. Cricket was of course curtailed after the German invasion in 1940.

1950s to 1980s

The 1950s saw visits to the Netherlands by Australia and the West Indies, in addition to their first match against Denmark. In 1958, the Cricket Board received a Royal Charter, and became the "Koninklijke Nederlandse Cricket Bond", a name which it retains to this day.

In August 1964, the Netherlands achieved their first victory against a Test-playing nation when they beat Australia by three wickets at The Hague. They were rewarded with associate membership of the ICC two years later.

The first two ICC Trophy tournaments, in 1979 and 1982, brought little success to the Dutch, who were eliminated in the first round in both tournaments. But in the 1986 tournament, they finished as runners-up to Zimbabwe. The same year, Paul-Jan Bakker became the first Dutch player to play county cricket. In 1989, the Dutch beat a strong England XI that included two future England captains, Alec Stewart and Nasser Hussain, by 3 runs.

1990s

In 1990 the Netherlands hosted the ICC Trophy, the first such tournament outside England, and again finished runners-up to Zimbabwe. In 1991 they achieved a five-wicket win over a West Indies XI, followed in 1993 by a seven-wicket win over an England XI and in 1994 a nine-wicket win over a South Africa XI. In 1994 the Dutch finally qualified for the World Cup, after finishing third in that year's ICC Trophy. In the World Cup itself in 1996, they were eliminated in the first round, but performed with some credit in their game against England.

1995 saw the Netherlands enter the NatWest Trophy for the first time. They took part in this tournament for ten years, and their best performance came in 1999 when they reached the fourth round, beating Durham along the way.

The Netherlands failed to qualify for the 1999 World Cup, as they could only manage sixth in the 1997 ICC Trophy. However, the country hosted one World Cup match, between Kenya and South Africa at Amstelveen.

The Netherlands competed in the first European Championship in 1996, coming second. They have competed in every tournament since, winning in 1998 and 2000.

21st century

2000–2009

2001 finally saw the Netherlands win the ICC Trophy, beating Namibia in the final in Toronto. They thus qualified for the 2003 World Cup. They again failed to progress beyond the first round in the tournament, but recorded their first one-day international win over Namibia during the tournament. Feiko Kloppenburg (with 121) and Klaas-Jan van Noortwijk (134 not out) scored the first two One Day International centuries in the side's history.

In the 2005 ICC Trophy, the Netherlands finished 5th, qualifying for the 2007 Cricket World Cup, and gaining one-day International status until the 2009 ICC World Cup Qualifier. Their first one-day international with this new status was scheduled to be against Kenya in March 2006; however this match was cancelled due to a Kenyan tour of Bangladesh. Instead their first ODI with this status (and their twelfth overall) came against Sri Lanka; this was their first ODI at home. However Sri Lanka won the two match series 2–0, with a then-record ODI score of 443–9.

The Dutch played their first Intercontinental Cup match of 2006 against Kenya in Nairobi in March. The game was drawn, but the Netherlands gained six points for a first innings lead. In August, the Netherlands competed in Division One of the European Championship. They beat Denmark and Italy, but lost to Scotland and their game against Ireland was rained off. They finished third in the tournament.

In November, the Dutch travelled to South Africa. They first played an Intercontinental Cup match against Bermuda:   David Hemp achieved what was then a competition record score of 247 not out in the drawn match. This was followed by a triangular series against Bermuda and Canada, which they won. Their final game of 2006, also in South Africa, was an Intercontinental Cup game against Canada. They won the match by 7 wickets, with Ryan ten Doeschate setting a new competition record individual score of 259 not out.

In early 2007, they travelled to Nairobi, Kenya to take part in Division One of the World Cricket League, finishing third out of six. This was followed by the 2007 World Cup in the West Indies, where they were eliminated in the first round, though they did beat Scotland along the way.

Following the World Cup, they underwent a period of transformation. Captain Luuk van Troost retired, as did Tim de Leede and their coach Peter Cantrell. Daan van Bunge also opted to take a break from international cricket, and the new coach opted not to retain the services of bowling coach Ian Pont.

In June 2007, they visited Canada, first winning an Intercontinental Cup match against Canada in King City, Ontario. They then won the first ODI by 117 runs, with the second one being abandoned. They then played a quadrangular series in Ireland, losing by ten wickets to the West Indies, and by one run to Ireland, with the game against Scotland being abandoned due to rain.

In August 2008, The Netherlands participated in the 2009 ICC World Twenty20 Qualifier. This was their debut playing Twenty20 International matches. They finished in first place in Group B, based on their run-rate. After beating Scotland in the Semi-Finals, the final was abandoned due to rain and the trophy was shared between The Netherlands and Ireland.

The Netherlands caused a sensation in the cricketing world by beating England in the opening match of the ICC World Twenty20 2009, whilst being 500/1 outsiders.

They lost their second match to the eventual winners Pakistan and did not qualify for the super 8 stage based on run rate.

2010–present

On 20 July 2010, The Netherlands beat a full-member nation for the first time in an ODI. In a one-off match shortened by rain to 30 overs a side, they beat Bangladesh by 6 wickets. The win in combination with their winning percentage against other associate and affiliate nations resulted in The Netherlands being included in ICC's official ODI-rankings.

On 22 February 2011, The Netherlands posted their highest ever total against a full-member nation, scoring 292 against England, batting first at the 2011 Cricket World Cup. Ryan Ten Doeschate top scored 119 from 110 balls. However, the Netherlands were unable to defend their strong total and failed to pull off a huge shock, England winning by 6 wickets with 2 overs to spare. They eventually failed to win any of their group matches and were last in their Group.

In September 2011, Netherlands whitewashed Kenya in a short two-match ODI series held at home.

In the 2014 ICC World Twenty20, Netherlands had one win and one loss before their final game. In order to go through on net run rate against Zimbabwe and Ireland, they needed to chase down Ireland's score in 14.2 overs or less. As Ireland scored 189, this seemed unlikely. However, strong and aggressive batting enabled them to score 193/4 in 13.5 overs, securing passage to the 2014 ICC World Twenty20 Super 10s. Although they lost their first three games in the group, including a 39/10 against Sri Lanka, they pulled off an upset against England in their last game.

In June 2014, Nepal along with Netherlands granted T20I status by the ICC board at the annual conference in Melbourne.

In their last match of the 2022 ICC T20 World Cup, The Netherlands defeated South Africa in a massive upset, knocking them out of the tournament as a result, also finishing in their best ever position (8th) to date in a T20 World Cup.

International grounds

Tournament history
A red box around the year indicates tournaments played within the Netherlands

ICC Cricket World Cup

ICC T20 World Cup

Other tournaments

ICC Champions Trophy
1998: Did not participate
2000: Did not participate
2002: First round
2004: Did not qualify
2006: Did not participate
2009: Did not participate
2013: Did not participate
2017: Did not participate

World Cricket League
2007 Division One: 3rd place
2010 Division One: 4th place
2011–13 Championship: 4th place
2015 Division Two: Won
2015–17 Championship: Won

Intercontinental Cup
2004: First round
2005: First round
2006: First round
2007–08: 5th place
2009–10: 6th place
2011–13: 8th place
2015–17: 3rd place

ICC 6 Nations Challenge
2000: Runners-up
2002: 6th place
2004: 4th place

ICC Trophy / World Cup Qualifier
1979: First round
1982: First round
1986: Runners-up
1990: Runners-up
1994: 3rd place
1997: 6th place
2001: Won
2005: 5th place
2009: 3rd place
2014: 7th place
2018: 7th place

European Championship
1996: Runners-up
1998: Won
2000: Division One winners
2002: 4th place (Division One)
2004: 3rd place (Division One)
2006: 3rd place (Division One)
2010–2015: Ineligible

ICC World Twenty20 Qualifier
2008: Joint winner (with Ireland)†
2010: 4th place
2012: 4th place
2013: 5th place
2015: Joint winner (with Scotland)†
2019: Won
2022: Runners-up
† The final was washed out by rain, so the trophy was shared.

Records and statistics

International match summary – Netherlands

Last updated 6 November 2022.

One-Day Internationals

 Highest team total: 315/8 v. Bermuda on 18 August 2007 at Hazelaarweg Stadion, Rotterdam
 Highest individual score: 137*, Wesley Barresi v. Kenya on 23 January 2014 at Bert Sutcliffe Oval, Lincoln
 Best individual bowling figures: 5/24, Timm van der Gugten v. Canada on 29 August 2013 at Maple Leaf Cricket Club, King City

Most ODI runs for Netherlands

Most ODI wickets for Netherlands

ODI record versus other nations

Records complete to ODI #4455. Last updated 21 August 2022.

Twenty20 Internationals

 Highest team total: 209/7 (19.3 overs) v. Nepal on 20 April 2021 at Tribhuvan University International Cricket Ground, Kirtipur.
 Highest individual score: 133*, Max O'Dowd v. Malaysia on 18 April 2021 at Tribhuvan University International Cricket Ground, Kirtipur.
 Best individual bowling figures: 5/19, Ahsan Malik v. South Africa on 27 March 2014 at Zohur Ahmed Chowdhury Stadium, Chittagong.

Most T20I runs for Netherlands

Most T20I wickets for Netherlands

T20I record versus other nations

Records complete to T20I #1871. Last updated 6 November 2022.

Other records

ICC Trophy
Highest team total: 425/4 v. Israel, 18 June 1986 at Solihull, England
Highest individual innings: 169 not out, Rupert Gomes v. Israel, 4 June 1990 at Amstelveen, Netherlands
Best innings bowling: 7/9, Asim Khan v. East & Central Africa, 24 March 1997 at Royal Military College, Kuala Lumpur, Malaysia

Notable players

Several Dutch cricketers have also played at first-class level elsewhere, the most successful of these probably being Roland Lefebvre who played for Somerset and Glamorgan in English county cricket as well as for Canterbury in New Zealand.

Dutch players to have played first class cricket outside of the Intercontinental Cup include:

Ryan ten Doeschate – Playing for Essex, Canterbury Wizards, Kolkata Knight Riders and the Mashonaland Eagles
Dirk Nannes – who has played for the Victorian Bushrangers in Australia, the Delhi Daredevils, the Royal Challengers Bangalore and the Chennai Super Kings in the IPL, and has played T20I and ODI cricket for Australia.
Nolan Clarke – who played for Barbados from 1969/70 until 1976/77.
Tom Cooper – who currently plays first class cricket for South Australia
Michael Swart - who played for Western Australia from 2010 until 2011.
Paul-Jan Bakker – who played for Hampshire from 1986 until 1992.
Alexei Kervezee – Playing for Worcestershire since 2007.
Bill Glerum – who played one first class game for the Free Foresters in 1957.
Carst Posthuma – who played five first class games for London County Cricket Club in 1903.
Darron Reekers – who played three first-class games for Otago in 1997/98 and List A matches for both Otago and Canterbury (1994/95-2001/02).
Daan van Bunge – who played for Middlesex in 2004.
Andre van Troost – who played for Somerset from 1991 to 1998, and for Griqualand West in the 1994/95 season in South Africa.
Bas Zuiderent – who played for Sussex from 2001 to 2003.
Timm van der Gugten – Played for New South Wales and others in Australia and New Zealand. Now playing for Glamorgan.
Logan van Beek - who currently plays for Wellington Firebirds and previously represented Canterbury Wizards

Current squad 
This lists of all players who have been selected in the team's most recent ODI or T20I squad. Pieter Seelaar has retired after the last ODI series.

Coaching staff

Coaches
The following people have coached the Dutch national side at various stages. For some coaches, the exact dates of their tenure are unavailable, although key tournaments are noted:

See also

Dutch national cricket captains
List of Netherlands ODI cricketers
List of Netherlands Twenty20 International cricketers
Netherlands national women's cricket team
Cricket in the Netherlands

Notes

References

External links
Royal Dutch Cricket Association (in Dutch)
VRA, Amsterdam

Cricket in the Netherlands
National cricket teams
Cricket
Netherlands in international cricket